Walter Smith Gurnee (March 9, 1813 – April 17, 1903) served as Mayor of Chicago (1851–53) for the Democratic Party. The Village of Gurnee, Illinois is named for him.

Biography
Gurnee was born in Haverstraw, New York and arrived in Chicago in 1836 after spending time in Michigan. Once in Chicago, he established a tannery, which, by 1844, employed between thirty and fifty men. He was a founding member of the Chicago Board of Trade. Prior to becoming the mayor of Chicago, Gurnee was the primary partner of Gurnee & Matteson, a saddlery and leather firm. Gurnee did well enough in this business, and in his tannery, that he amassed a large fortune before moving to New York City.

Gurnee campaigned for the mayoralty on the issue of public ownership of the city's water supply. Once in office, he fought against the merger of the Illinois Central and Michigan Central railroads, originally planned to meet up south of the city. He was elected to two terms, winning the mayoralty in 1851 and being reelected in 1852.

Gurnee unsuccessfully attempted to stage a return to the mayor's office in the 1860 mayoral election. He lost to "Long John" Wentworth, who had previously served a term as mayor as a Democrat, but had switched to the Republican Party.

References

External links
Village of Gurnee, IL history page
1st Inaugural speech at Chicago Public Library
2nd Inaugural speech at Chicago Public Library

1813 births
1903 deaths
Illinois Democrats
New York (state) Democrats
Mayors of Chicago
People from Haverstraw, New York
Place of death missing
Burials at Sleepy Hollow Cemetery